Miss World USA 1967 was the 6th edition of the Miss World USA pageant and it was held at the Baltimore Civic Center in Baltimore, Maryland and was won by Pamela Valari Pall of California. She was crowned by outgoing titleholder, Denice Estelle Blair of Utah. Pall went on to represent the United States at the Miss World 1967 Pageant in London later that year. She finished in the Top 15 at Miss World.

This year was also significant as, the name of the pageant was again changed with the new name being Miss World USA. The pageant would continue being called Miss World USA until 1978.

Results

Placements

Special awards

Delegates
The Miss World USA 1967 delegates were:

 Alabama - Margie Ann Williams
 Arizona - Gigi Dahl
 Boston, MA - Marie A. Skane
 Bridgeport, CT - Linda E. Drew
 California - Pamela Valari Pall
 Cleveland, OH - Peggy Chuey
 Colorado - Alice Roy
 Connecticut - Gail Jean Koziar
 Delaware - Patty Ann McNulty
 Detroit, MI - Elaine Lynette Kissel
 District of Columbia - Diane Mothershead
 Florida - Cathie Parker
 Georgia - Judy Purtle
 Hawaii - Ann Marie
 Idaho - Lana Aloha Clark
 Illinois - Izolda Snarskis
 Indiana - Linda Sue Britzke
 Iowa - Carolyn Delores Williams
 Kansas - Lesta L. Riley
 Kentucky - Nanette Marchel
 Long Island, NY - Nancy Jo Brossman
 Los Angeles, CA - Susan Lee Glicksman
 Louisiana - Linda Sue Eckert
 Maryland - Paula Jean Martin
 Massachusetts - Cheryl Lee Stankiewicz
 Michigan - Janice Marie Cailotto
 Mississippi - Pat Haley
 Missouri - Vicki Kay Calloway
 Montana - Sherry Gene Evans
 Nebraska - Stacey Porter
 Nevada - Lenore Stevens
 New Hampshire - Paula Peterson
 New Jersey - Carol Jean Rubin
 New Mexico - Cheryl Darlynn Bain
 New York - Patricia Louise McKeegan
 New York City, NY - Madeline Young
 North Carolina - Brenda Carol Ray
 North Dakota - Marcia Jane Wise
 Ohio - Phyllis Jeanne Darling
 Oregon - Peggy McNeill
 Pennsylvania - Barbara Levitt
 Philadelphia, PA - Ellen Doris Portnoff
 Rhode Island - Carol Scotti
 South Carolina - Penny Rebecca Mikell
 South Dakota - Linda Polluck
 Tennessee - Janet Elizabeth Boston
 Texas - Sammilu Williamson
 Utah - Lynette Thomas
 Virginia - Brenda Maddox
 Washington - Johnine Leigh Avery
 West Virginia - Kimberly Ann Kuster
 Wyoming - Mardell Green

Notes

Did not Compete

Crossovers
Contestants who competed in other beauty pageants:

Miss USA
1967:  Bridgeport, CT - Linda E. Drew (as )
1968: : Diane Mothershead
1970: : Cheryl Lee Stankiewicz

References

External links
Miss World Official Website
Miss World America Official Website

1967 in the United States
World America
1967
1967 in Maryland